The 2019 Wellington local elections are part of the wider 2019 New Zealand local elections, to elect members to sub-national councils and boards. The Wellington elections cover one regional council (the Greater Wellington Regional Council), eight territorial authorities (city and district councils), three district health boards, and various community boards and licensing trusts.

Greater Wellington Regional Council

Councillors standing down  
By July 2019 four councillors had announced that they would not be standing for re-election to the Wellington Regional Council; Sue Kedgley, Chris Laidlaw, Ian McKinnon and  Paul Swain. The GWRC has been "under fire" for changes to the bus services, particularly in Wellington city.

Kapiti Coast constituency (1) 

 Penny Gaylor
 Neil Mackay

Te Awa Kairangi ki Uta/Upper Hutt constituency (1) 

 Ros Connelly
 Mark Crofskey
 Bill Hammond
 Steve Pattinson

Wairarapa constituency (1) 

 Pim Borren
 Richard Moore
 Adrienne Staples

Porirua-Tawa constituency (2) 

 Jenny Brash
 Barbara Donaldson
 Chris Kirk-Burnnand
 Vaughn Liley
 Phillip Marshall (Labour)
 Natalie Repia
 Roger Watkin

Te Awa Kairangi ki Tai/Lower Hutt constituency (3) 

 Leonie Dobbs
 Peter Glensor
 Ken Laban
 Pue Lamason
 David Ogden
 Josh van Lier

Poneke/Wellington constituency (5) 

 Roger Blakeley
 Gavin Bruce
 Tony de Lorenzo
 Jill Ford
 Alexander Garside
 Glenda Hughes (Wellington Party)
 Tony Jansen
 John Klaphake
 Anand Kochunny
 David Lee
 Yvonne Legarth
 Troy Mihaka (Wellington Party)
 Deane Milne
 Thomas Nash (Green)
 Philip O'Brien (Wellington Party)
 Bryce Pender
 Daran Ponter (Labour)
 Phil Quin
 Victoria Rhodes-Carlin
 Helene Ritchie
 Lesleigh Salinger
 Sam Somers
 Ray Wilson

Kapiti Coast District Council

Porirua City Council

Upper Hutt City Council

Mayor (1) 
 Wayne Guppy
 Angela McLeod
 Steve Taylor

Councillors (10) 

 Michael Anderson
 Dylan Bentley
 Chris Carson
 Luke Cooke
 Ted Cooper
 Blair Griffiths
 Michael Hurle
 Harry Dale Kent
 Paul Lambert
 Rebecca Macann
 Glenn McArthur
 Angela McLeod
 D J McNicholas
 Heather Newell
 Michael Newell
 Hellen Swales
 Steve Taylor
 Paul Thompson
 Tracy Ultra
 Dave Wheeler

Hutt City Council

Mayor (1) 

 James Anderson
 Campbell Barry (Labour)
 George MacKay
 David Smith
 Ray Wallace

Councillors – at-large (6) 

 James Anderson
 Campbell Barry (Labour)
 Josh Briggs
 Brady Dyer
 Simon Edwards
 Michael Gray
 Deborah Hislop
 Tesh Kells
 Michael Lulich
 George MacKay
 Chris Norton (Green)
 Ashok Neil Parbhu
 Joshua Peauafi
 Shazly Rasheed
 Naomi Shaw
 Phil Sprey
 Kamiria Mid Thomas-Savelio
 Gabriel Tupou
 Karen Yung

Councillor – Central ward (1) 
Incumbent councillor David Bassett was re-elected unopposed.

Councillor – Eastern ward (1) 

 Glenda Barratt
 Andy Mitchell

Councillor – Harbour ward (1) 

 Tui Lewis
 Simon Monrad
 Gavin Murphy

Councillor – Northern ward (1) 

 Casey Diver
 Julie Englebretsen
 Leigh Sutton

Councillor – Wainuiomata ward (1) 

 Keri Brown (Labour)
 Anania Randell

Councillor – Western ward (1) 

 Margaret Cousins
 Chris Milne
 Chris Parkin

Wellington City Council

Mayor

Motukairangi/Eastern Ward Ward 
The Motukairangi-Eastern ward returns three councillors to the Wellington City Council. The incumbents were Sarah Free, Simon Marsh, and Chris Calvi-Freeman—Free and Calvi-Freeman sought re-election; Marsh did not.

Free was re-elected in the first count, and newcomer Teri O'Neill was elected in the fourth (after the elimination of Ajay Rathod, Bernard O'Shaughnessy, and Steph Edlin, in that order). The final seat was taken in the fifth count by Sean Rush, who had overtaken Calvi-Freeman after starting narrowly behind him.

Paekawakawa/Southern Ward 

The Paekawakawa/Southern ward returns two councillors to the Wellington City Council. The incumbents were Fleur Fitzsimons and David Lee—Fitzsimons sought re-election; Lee did not.

Fitzsimons and newcomer Laurie Foon (from the same party as outgoing councillor Lee) were both elected in the first count. Since there were only two seats to be filled, no further counts were necessary.

Pukehīnau/Lambton Ward 

The Pukehīnau/Lambton ward returns three councillors to the Wellington City Council. The incumbents were Iona Pannett, Nicola Young, and Brian Dawson—all three sought re-election.

Pannett and Young received enough votes in the first count to be elected immediately. Dawson lost his seat in the sixth count to newcomer Tamatha Paul, after all other candidates (Harry Smith, Lee Orchard, and Shan Ng) had been eliminated.

Takapū/Northern Ward 

The Takapū/Northern ward returns three councillors to the Wellington City Council. The incumbents were Jill Day, Malcolm Sparrow, and Peter Gilberd—all three sought re-election.

Day and Sparrow retained their seats (the former being re-elected in the first round). Gilberd was beaten for the last seat by a newcomer, Jenny Condie, after the elimination (in order) of Tracy Hurst-Porter, John Peters, Graeme Sawyer, and John Apanowicz.

Wharangi/Onslow-Western Ward 

The Wharangi/Onslow-Western ward returns three councillors to the Wellington City Council. The incumbents were Andy Foster, Simon Woolf, and Diane Calvert—all three were on the ballot again, although Foster's candidacy was superseded by his victory in the mayoral race, and his votes were redistributed according to next preferences.

Calvert was re-elected in the first count. Woolf was re-elected in the seventh, after Ray Chung, Richard McIntosh, and Rohan Biggs were eliminated. Newcomer Rebecca Matthews was elected in the tenth, after the elimination of Conor Hill and over Michelle Rush, the other remaining candidate.

Masterton District Council

Mayor (1) 

 Cory Burling
 Graeme Farr
 Tina Nixon
 Lyn Patterson

Councillors (10) 

 Gary Caffell
 Deborah Davidson
 Brent Gare
 Carys Gibbs
 David Holmes
 Jonathan Hooker
 Peter James
 Bex Johnson
 Ronald Karaitiana
 Donna Laing
 John Lapslie
 Britt Leveridge
 Frazer Mailman
 Graham McClymont
 Isabella McClymont
 Tim Nelson
 Tina Nixon
 Chris Peterson
 Sandy Ryan
 David Wright

Carterton District Council

Mayor (1) 

 Bernard Bottrill
 Graeme Farr
 Jill Greathead
 Greg Lang

Councillors (8) 

 Dalina Armstrong
 Steffen Bertram
 Bernard Bottrill
 Roger Boulter
 Ruth Carter
 Robyn Cherry-Campbell
 Steve Cretney
 Brian Deller
 John Fairbrother
 Jill Greathead
 Jenna Hagan
 Russell Keys
 Douge Mende
 Hank Optland
 Mike Osborne
 Marty Sebire
 Ron Shaw
 Rob Stockley
 Rebecca Vergunst
 Justus Verheij
 Dale Williams

South Wairarapa District Council

Mayor (1) 

 Beijen Alex
 Graeme Farr
 Dayle Harwood
 Viv Napier

Councillors – Greytown ward (3) 

 James Bicknall
 Rebecca Fox
 Leigh Hay
 Alistair Plimmer
 Warren Woodgyer

Councillors – Featherston ward (3) 

 Garrick Emms
 Colin Olds
 Ross Vickery
 Brenda West

Councillors – Martinborough ward (3) 

 Pam Colenso
 Daphne Geisler
 Jason Jackson
 Brian Jepson
 Pip Maynard

References 

Wellington
Politics of the Wellington Region
Wellington
2010s in Wellington